Wakefield-Peacedale (listed as "Wakefield-Peace Dale" by the United States Census Bureau) is a census-designated place (CDP) in the town of South Kingstown in Washington County, Rhode Island, United States that includes the villages of Peace Dale and Wakefield.  The population was 8,487 at the 2010 census.

Geography
Wakefield-Peacedale is located at  (41.441234, -71.499290).

According to the United States Census Bureau, the CDP has a total area of 5.1 mi2 (13.2 km2). 4.9 mi2 (12.6 km2) of it is land and 0.2 mi2 (0.6 ²) (4.70%) is water.

Demographics
At the 2000 census, there were 8,468 people, 3,221 households and 2,174 families residing in the CDP. The population density was 671.4/km2 (1,739.4/mi2). There were 3,385 housing units at an average density of 268.4/km2 (695.3/mi2). The racial makeup of the CDP was 90.34% White, 2.01% African American, 3.08% Native American, 1.23% Asian, 0.56% from other races, and 2.79% from two or more races. Hispanic or Latino of any race were 1.56% of the population.

There were 3,221 households, of which 36.5% had children under the age of 18 living with them, 50.4% were married couples living together, 13.1% had a female householder with no husband present, and 32.5% were non-families. 25.8% of all households were made up of individuals, and 10.2% had someone living alone who was 65 years of age or older. The average household size was 2.58 and the average family size was 3.14.

28.4% of the population were under the age of 18, 6.5% from 18 to 24, 29.6% from 25 to 44, 22.2% from 45 to 64, and 13.2% who were 65 years of age or older. The median age was 37 years. For every 100 females, there were 87.8 males. For every 100 females age 18 and over, there were 83.4 males.

The median household income was $50,313 and the median family income was $61,541. Males had a median income of $47,470 compared with $26,922 for females. The per capita income was $24,191. About 3.9% of families and 5.4% of the population were below the poverty line, including 4.4% of those under age 18 and 6.0% of those age 65 or over.

References

External links

Town of South Kingstown, Rhode Island

Census-designated places in Washington County, Rhode Island
South Kingstown, Rhode Island
Census-designated places in Rhode Island